is a railway station on the Echigo Line in Nishi-ku, Niigata, Niigata Prefecture, Japan, operated by East Japan Railway Company (JR East).

Lines
Kobari Station is served by the Echigo Line, and is 76.3 kilometers from the starting point of the line at Kashiwazaki Station.

Layout

The station consists of two ground-level opposed side platforms connected by a footbridge, serving two tracks.

The station has a "Midori no Madoguchi" staffed ticket office. Suica farecard can be used at this station.

Platforms

History 
The station opened on 1 June 1960. With the privatization of Japanese National Railways (JNR) on 1 April 1987, the station came under the control of JR East.

Passenger statistics
In fiscal 2017, the station was used by an average of 2605 passengers daily (boarding passengers only).

Surrounding area
 Niigata Industrial High School
 Kobari Junior High School
 Kobari Elementary School

See also
 List of railway stations in Japan

References

External links

 JR East station information 

Railway stations in Niigata (city)
Railway stations in Japan opened in 1960
Stations of East Japan Railway Company
Echigo Line